The 1915 Georgetown Blue and Gray football team represented Georgetown University during the 1915 college football season. Led by Albert Exendine in his second year as head coach, the team went 7–2.

Schedule

References

Georgetown
Georgetown Hoyas football seasons
South Atlantic Intercollegiate Athletic Association football champion seasons
Georgetown Blue and Gray football